This is a list of airlines currently operating in Mozambique.

See also
 List of airlines
 List of defunct airlines of Mozambique
 List of air carriers banned in the European Union
 List of companies based in Mozambique

Mozambique
Airlines
Airlines
Mozambique